The Car is a 1955 painting by Australian artist John Brack. The painting depicts a family in a car on a drive in a rural area. The painting shows the father looking at the road ahead while the mother and children look towards the viewer. While the whole car cannot be seen, the car itself is identifiable as a Triumph Mayflower. The landscape, seen through the windows of the car, has been said to be inspired by the work of his contemporary Fred Williams.

The work was painted around the same time as two of Brack's best-known paintings, Collins Street., 5 pm (1955) and  The Bar (1954).

Brack described how he came to paint the work:

Kirsty Grant, Senior Curator of Australian Art at the National Gallery of Victoria claims that The Car is one of Brack's more popular works stating "I think it transports people who lived through that time, whether they are adults or children, back to that era ...The Car is familiar. It is about people and the way we behave and our foibles."

The painting is part of the National Gallery of Victoria's Australian art collection. The painting was part of the Australia exhibition at the Royal Academy in 2013.

References

External links
The Car - National Gallery of Victoria collection.

Paintings by John Brack
Paintings in the collection of the National Gallery of Victoria
1955 paintings
Arts in Melbourne